The United States's Toggle nuclear test series was a group of 28 nuclear tests conducted in 1972–1973. These tests  followed the Operation Grommet series and preceded the Operation Arbor series.

Shots

Diamond Sculls
Diamond Sculls was a horizontal line-of-sight (HLOS) nuclear test. Its purpose was to test the radiation hardness of the LIM-49 Spartan anti-ballistic missile. It was the largest HLOS test conducted by the United States, consisting of a  diameter test chamber and a  line-of-sight pipe.

List of the nuclear tests

References

Explosions in 1972
Explosions in 1973
1972 in military history
1973 in military history
Toggle